Colt 45 may refer to:

Firearms
 .45 ACP cartridge
 .45 Colt cartridge
 Colt Single Action Army, a revolver produced by Colt's Manufacturing Company
 M1911 pistol, a semi-automatic pistol produced by Colt's Manufacturing Company

Arts, entertainment, and media
 Colt .45 (1950 film), a Randolph Scott Western
 Colt 45 (2014 film), a French thriller
 Colt .45 (TV series), a Western television series
 "Colt 45" (song) or "2 Zig Zags", alternate names for "Crazy Rap", a 2000 single by Afroman
 Colts Drum and Bugle Corps, previously named the Colt .45 Drum and Bugle Corps

Sports
 Colt 45 (basketball), a Philippine Basketball League team
 Colt 45, the finishing maneuver of professional wrestlers Colt Cabana and Colten Gunn
 Houston Colt .45s, a baseball team that was renamed the Houston Astros

Other uses
 Colt 45 (malt liquor), an American alcoholic beverage brewed by the Pabst Brewing Company

See also
 .45 caliber